The 2018 Women's European Water Polo Championship was held from 14 to 27 July 2018 in Barcelona, Spain.

The Netherlands won their fifth title by defeating Greece 6-4 in the final. Spain captured the bronze medal after a 12-6 win over Hungary.

Qualification

Twelve teams were allowed to the tournament. The qualification was as follows:
 The host nation
 The best five teams from the 2016 European Championships
 Six teams from the qualifiers

Format
The twelve teams were split in two groups with six teams each. The first four teams of each group played each other in the quarterfinals in cross group format, the remaining teams played for places nine to twelve.

Squads

Draw
The draw of the tournament took take place on 7 March in Barcelona. The first batch consisted of the teams ranked 1st and 2nd in the 2016 European Championship, the second batch those placed 3rd and 4th, the third batch those placed 5th and 6th. The six remaining teams were placed into the fourth batch.

Preliminary round
All times are CEST (UTC+2).

Group A

Group B

Final Round
Championship bracket

5th place bracket

Quarterfinals
All times are CEST (UTC+2).

5th–8th place classification
All times are CEST (UTC+2).

Semifinals
All times are CEST (UTC+2).

11th place match
All times are CEST (UTC+2).

9th place match
All times are CEST (UTC+2).

7th place match
All times are CEST (UTC+2).

5th place match
All times are CEST (UTC+2).

Bronze medal match
All times are CEST (UTC+2).

Gold medal match
All times are CEST (UTC+2).

Final ranking

Team roster
Laura Aarts, Maud Megens, Dagmar Genee (C), Sabrina van der Sloot, Iris Wolves, Nomi Stomphorst, Bente Rogge, Vivian Sevenich, Kitty-Lynn Joustra, Ilse Koolhaas, Rozanne Voorvelt, Brigitte Sleeking, Debby Willemsz. Head coach: Arno Havenga

Awards and statistics

Top goalscorers

Source: wp2018bcn.microplustiming.com

Top goalkeepers

Source: wp2018bcn.microplustiming.com

Individual awards

Most Valuable Player

Best Goalkeeper

Top Scorer
 — 25 goals

References

External links
Official website

Women
Women's European Water Polo Championship
International water polo competitions hosted by Spain
Women's European Water Polo Championship
Sports competitions in Barcelona
Women's European Water Polo Championship
Women's European Water Polo Championship
Women's European Water Polo Championship
Women's water polo in Spain
Women's European Water Polo Championship